Jerold is a given name. Notable people with the name include:

Jerold Hoffberger (1919–1999), American businessman
Jerold Ottley, music director of the Mormon Tabernacle Choir from 1974 to 1999
Jerold Promes (born 1984), Dutch footballer who currently plays for Sparta Rotterdam
Jerold Starr (born 1941), American writer and professor best known as a national reformer of public broadcasting
Jerold T. Hevener (born 1873), American film actor and director
Jerold Wells (1908–1999), English actor
Jerold Panas (1928-2018), English Author